This page summarises the Australia national soccer team fixtures and results in 2007.

Summary
The Socceroos played a number of friendly fixtures throughout the year with mixed results; three wins and three losses. More importantly, 2007 was the year Australia first participated in the AFC Asian Cup. After their performance in the 2006 World Cup, Australia entered the tournament as one of the favourites. However, in the opening game against Oman it was only a late equaliser that rescued Australia a point before losing to eventual champions Iraq. It took three late goals to finally see off joint hosts Thailand and go through to the quarter finals where they would lose to Japan in a penalty shoot-out.

Record

Match results

Friendlies

2007 AFC Asian Cup

Goal scorers

References

2007
2007 in Australian soccer
2007 national football team results